Namkwi is a village in Myitkyina Township in Myitkyina District in the Kachin State of north-eastern Burma. It is located 4 miles from the city of Myitkyina.

Nearby towns and villages include Auche (13.7 nm), Hpaochan (13.4 nm), Seingneing (10.0 nm), Namyu (7.2 nm), Charpate (1.8 nm), Namponmao (5.7 nm), Naunghi(4.1 nm), Pamati (4.1 nm).

References

External links
Satellite map at Maplandia.com

Populated places in Kachin State